Yetunde Odunuga (born 19 November 1997) is a Nigerian amateur boxer who won a bronze medal at the 2018 Commonwealth Games.

Career 
Yetunde competed at the 2018 Commonwealth Games. She won a bronze medal in the middleweight event against Caroline Veyre.

In 2017, Yetunde Odunuga, a Nigerian Army officer, won gold in the women’s lightweight category in the African Amateur Boxing Championships, Brazzaville, Congo.

References

External links 
Boxing | Daily Schedule - Gold Coast 2018 Commonwealth Games

Nigerian women boxers
Lightweight boxers
1997 births
Living people
Boxers at the 2018 Commonwealth Games
Commonwealth Games bronze medallists for Nigeria
Commonwealth Games medallists in boxing
Medallists at the 2018 Commonwealth Games